The Second High School Attached to Beijing Normal University is a secondary school in the north Beijing neighbourhood of Xicheng. As a school "attached" to a major university, it is considered a prestigious institution, and the entry requirements for the programmes are quite rigorous. In a 2016 ranking of Chinese high schools that send students to study in American universities, it ranked number 16 in mainland China in terms of the number of students entering top American universities.

The school's character is international, with students from countries such as South Korea and Russia and teachers from Canada and the United States as well as China. There are also foreign programmes taught at the school, such as SYA.

History
The Second High School Attached to Beijing Normal University was founded in 1953, along with two other High Schools attached to Beijing Normal University. The three schools are model schools that teaches students Humanities or Science. In 1956, the first group of Junior
middle school students graduated and the first group of high school students are recruited. In 1959, the first group of high school students graduated. In 1960, the school officially changed its name into "the Second High School attached to Beijing Normal University". In 1963, the school started "the Experimental Class for Liberal Arts" which was permitted by ministry of education. In 1965, the school started "Class for science" which was permitted by ministry of education. In 1969, the school was confirmed to be the first group of schools to open to foreign countries and started international communications. In 1971, the school restarted College Entrance Examination. In 1997, the Sail of Three colors Middle school was established. In 2008, the international program class started to recruit students.

The school's original plan was to prepare students to become teachers. Today, this school is using Robotics and digital applications to solve problems. On March 21, 2014, Michelle Obama along with Peng Liyuan visited the school to talk about advancements in technology. Michelle Obama saw students test robotics and calligraphy.

Foreign programmes

Project Global Access 
The Project Global Access programme is an arrangement that The Second High School Attached to Beijing Normal University, along with a number of schools in China, has with the China Center for International Educational Exchange. The programme has expanded dramatically in size from only a handful of foreign teachers and several dozens of students to currently 14 foreign teachers (from Australia, Canada, Great Britain, New Zealand and the United States) and to several hundreds of students. Students take modules divided into 3 levels, covering English language and communication ability, science, mathematics and data processing ability, the ability to use computers, business learning ability and independent study skills. Students completing this programme can proceed to university, either in China or abroad. Students in this programme receive instruction in both English and Chinese.

Saint Paul American School 
The "Saint Paul" in Saint Paul American School refers to the city in Minnesota. Its focus differs from Project Global Access in that it provides an American style education and mainly serves on foreign students living in Beijing. Most students in this programme are South Korean, although other nationalities are represented.

Sister schools 

Hwa Chong Institution, Singapore

Punahou School, Hawaii, United States

Roskilde Cathedral School, Denmark

Ørestad Gymnasium, Denmark

St Paul's Girls' School, England

Hutchins School, Australia

Sidwell Friends School, Washington, D.C., United States

Boston College High School, Boston, Massachusetts, United States

See also 

 List of schools in Xicheng District

References

External links

 
 Information about the Saint Paul programme 
 Official website of the Project Global Access programme 
 The school's Project Global Access programme 
 English website of the China Center for International Educational Exchange 

High schools in Beijing
Beijing Normal University
Educational institutions established in 1953
1953 establishments in China